The 2018 Nevada Senate election took place as part of the biennial United States elections. Nevada voters elected state senators in 11 of the state senate's 21 districts. State senators serve four-year terms in the Nevada State Senate.

A primary election on June 12, 2018 determined which candidates appear on the November 6 general election ballot. Primary election results can be obtained from the State of Nevada's Secretary of State website.

Due to resignations and appointments, on election day 2018, there were 10 Democrats, 1 independent (caucusing with Democrats), 8 Republicans, and 2 vacancies in the Nevada Senate. To claim control of the chamber from Democrats, the Republicans needed to net 3 Senate seats.

Background 
Following the 2016 state senate elections, Democrats flipped control of the Senate away from the Republicans with a slim majority of 11 Democrats to 10 Republicans. On November 14, 2016, Sen. Patricia Farley switched from Republican to non-partisan and began caucusing with the Democrats, increasing their majority to 12 seats. Democrat Ruben Kihuen of District 10 resigned to become a member of the U.S. House, and he was replaced by Democrat Yvanna Cancela on December 6, 2016. Democrat Mark Manendo of District 21 resigned amid allegations of sexual harassment on July 19, 2017 and Republican Becky Harris of District 9 resigned in January 2018 to chair the Nevada Gaming Control Board.

Results

Summary of results by State Senate district
For districts not displayed, there is no election until 2020.

Source:

Close races
Seats where the margin of victory was under 10%:

Detailed results by State Senate district

Results are only shown for races that were contested. In uncontested races (i.e., only one person ran), the Nevada Secretary of State's website does not provide results.
Sources:

District 2
Both primaries were uncontested.

District 8

District 9
The Republican primary was uncontested.

District 10
The general election was uncontested.

District 12
Both primaries were uncontested.

District 13
Democratic primary was uncontested and Republicans did not contest this election.

District 14
Both primaries were uncontested.

District 16
The Democratic primary was uncontested.

District 17
Both primaries were uncontested.

District 20

District 21
The Republican primary was uncontested.

See also
United States elections, 2018
United States Senate election in Nevada, 2018
United States House of Representatives elections in Nevada, 2018
Nevada elections, 2018
Nevada gubernatorial election, 2018
Nevada lieutenant gubernatorial election, 2018
Nevada Attorney General election, 2018
Nevada Secretary of State election, 2018
Nevada Treasurer election, 2018
Nevada Controller election, 2018
Nevada Supreme Court elections, 2018 Supreme Court Seats C, F, & G
Nevada State Assembly election, 2018

Notes

References

Nevada Senate elections
state senate
Nevada State Senate